The following highways are numbered 344:

Australia
 - Heathcote-Nagambie Road

Canada
Manitoba Provincial Road 344
Newfoundland and Labrador Route 344
 Nova Scotia Route 344
 Quebec Route 344
Route 344 (Prince Edward Island)

India
 National Highway 344 (India)

Japan
 Japan National Route 344

United States
  County Road 344 (Gilchrist County, Florida)
  Arkansas Highway 344
  Georgia State Route 344 (former)
  Kentucky Route 344
  Maryland Route 344
  New York State Route 344
  North Carolina Highway 344
  Ohio State Route 344
 Oklahoma State Highway 344
  South Carolina Highway 344
  Tennessee State Route 344
 Texas:
  Texas State Highway 344 (former)
  Texas State Highway Loop 344
  Farm to Market Road 344
  Virginia State Route 344
Territories
  Puerto Rico Highway 344